On the 2000 Christmas Eve, a series of explosions took place in Indonesia, which were part of a high-scale terrorist attack by Al Qaeda and Jemaah Islamiyah. The attack involved a series of coordinated bombings of churches in Jakarta and eight other cities which killed 18 people and injured many others.

Bombing locations
A breakdown of the bombings is as follows:
Jakarta: Five Catholic and Protestant churches, including the Roman Catholic Cathedral, were targeted, killing at least three people.
Pekanbaru: Four police officers killed trying to disarm a bomb; a civilian also died
Medan: Explosions hit churches
Bandung: Explode at production, bomb maker died
Batam Island: Three bombs injure 22
Mojokerto: Three churches bombed; one dead. One of them is the Eben Haezer church in Jalan Raden Ajeng Kartini. At around 8:30pm on December 24, 2000, while trying to throw the bomb away, a Muslim security volunteer, Riyanto, was killed;
Mataram: Three churches bombed
Sukabumi: Bombings kill three

Arrests
Two suspects were arrested following the bombings. Indonesian police say they found documents implicating Hambali in the bombings. Abu Bakar Bashir was tried for involvement in the bombings in 2003 but was found not guilty; he was subsequently convicted of involvement in the 2002 Bali bombing.

In popular culture
The Indonesian progressive metal band Kekal has cited the bombings as an inspiration for its anti-terrorism song "Mean Attraction," which appeared on its third full-length album, The Painful Experience.

See also
Terrorism in Indonesia
Christmas in Indonesia
Freedom of religion in Indonesia

References

External links
Jemaah Islamiyah Shown to Have Significant Ties to al Qaeda
Christmas Eve bombings target Christians

Attacks in Asia in 2000
Jemaah Islamiyah
Mass murder in 2000
Terrorist incidents in Indonesia in 2000
Persecution of Christians in Indonesia
Islamic terrorist incidents in 2000
Improvised explosive device bombings in Indonesia
2000 murders in Indonesia
December 2000 events in Asia
Islamic terrorism in Indonesia
Church bombings by Islamists